The War and Peace Memorial Park Exhibition Center is a gallery in Beigan Township, Lienchiang County, Taiwan.

History
The area around the gallery used to be the Stronghold #06, #08 and #12 during the Chinese Civil War. The planning to establish the center started in 2003 covering a total area of 38.8 which includes the gallery building and the surrounding park. The gallery was opened on 29 March 2010.

Exhibition
The gallery displays history about Matsu under military rule, from the origins, chronology of military events, military items and military-citizens social culture display areas.

See also
 List of tourist attractions in Taiwan

References

2010 establishments in Taiwan
Beigan Township
Buildings and structures in Lienchiang County
Memorial parks in Taiwan
Tourist attractions in Lienchiang County